is a pop song by the Japanese duo and idol unit ClariS, written by Shō Watanabe. It was released as the unit's sixth single on October 10, 2012 by SME Records. The song was used as the opening theme to the first two Puella Magi Madoka Magica anime films. A music video was produced for "Luminous". The single peaked at No. 4 on Japan's weekly Oricon singles chart, and was later awarded a Gold Disc by the Recording Industry Association of Japan for having exceeded 100,000 copies shipped in a single year.

Composition
"Luminous" is a J-pop song with instrumentation from piano, violin and drums. It is set in common time and moves at a tempo of 173 beats per minute. Beginning in the G major key, the introduction starts with only piano and adds drums and violin to transition into the first verse in C-sharp minor, followed by the chorus. After a bridge in G major, the key shifts back to C-sharp minor for the second verse and chorus, which use the same music with different lyrics. The key shifts from C-sharp minor to G major with a short break used to transition into the third verse, immediately followed by the chorus in C-sharp minor as the outro. A short coda is used to close the song.

Release and reception
"Luminous" was released in a regular edition and two limited editions on October 10, 2012 as a CD by SME Records in Japan. One of the limited edition versions was packaged with Puella Magi Madoka Magica artwork and instead of containing an instrumental version of "Luminous" as in the other two editions, it has a short version of the song in addition to a short orchestral version of "Connect". The other limited edition version came bundled with a DVD containing the music video for "Luminous". The song peaked at No. 4 on Japan's weekly Oricon singles chart, selling over 39,000 copies in its first week of sales, and charted for 18 weeks. In December 2014, "Luminous" was certified gold by the Recording Industry Association of Japan (RIAJ) for having exceeded 100,000 copies shipped in a single year. "Luminous" debuted and peaked on the Billboard Japan Hot 100 at No. 5.

Music video
The music video is entirely animated. It features throughout the video semi-animated illustrations of ClariS by Hideyuki Morioka blended with scenes from the first Puella Magi Madoka Magica anime film, Puella Magi Madoka Magica: Beginnings.

Track listing

Personnel
ClariS
Clara – vocals
Alice – vocals

Production
Takashi Koiwa – mixer
Kōtarō Kojima – mastering
Tatsuo Murai – art direction, design

Charts

References

2012 singles
2012 songs
ClariS songs
Puella Magi Madoka Magica songs
SME Records singles
Songs written for animated films